The 1996 Grolsch Open, also known as the Dutch Open, was a men's tennis tournament played on outdoor clay courts in Amsterdam, Netherlands and was part of the World Series of the 1996 ATP Tour. It was the 33rd edition of the tournament and was held from 29 July until 4 August 1996. Sixth-seeded Francisco Clavet won the singles title, his second at the event after 1990.

Finals

Singles

 Francisco Clavet defeated  Younes El Aynaoui 7–5, 6–1, 6–1
 It was Clavet's only singles title of the year and the 3rd of his career.

Doubles

 Donald Johnson /  Francisco Montana defeated  Rikard Bergh /  Jack Waite 6–4, 3–6, 6–2
 It was Johnson's 2nd title of the year and the 2nd of his career. It was Montana's 2nd title of the year and the 5th of his career.

References

External links
 ITF tournament edition details

Grolsch Open
Dutch Open (tennis)
Dutch Open (tennis)
Dutch Open (tennis), 1996
Dutch Open
Dutch Open
1996 Dutch Open (tennis)